The 1925 Buffalo Bisons season was their sixth in the league. The team failed to improve on their previous record against league opponents of 6–5, winning one game. They finished fifteenth in the league. 

This was the first season since 1917 that star player Tommy Hughitt did not take the field for Buffalo; he had retired at the end of the previous season.

Schedule

Game in italics was against a non-NFL team.

Standings

References

Buffalo Bisons (NFL) seasons
Buffalo Bisons
Buffalo Bisons NFL